Gällivare dialects are a dialect group of Meänkieli or Northern Finnish. They are spoken around Gällivare, but also in Killivaara and Nattavaara. Features of the dialects are absence of Vowel harmony: kyla 'village' (Meänkieli and Finnish: kylä), and the passive being used for the third person plural ending: äijät poltethin (Finnish: ukot polttivat). The dialect is also heavily influenced by Swedish and many loanwords have entered the Gällivare dialects. A Gällivare dialect dictionary was made in 1992 by Birger Winsa.

Features 

 Passive being used for the third person plural ending
 /o/ has changed to /u/ often: isu 'big', (Finnish: iso).
 Triphthongs: syöi 'ate'.

Example 
Oliko tännet tietä ennen?
 ei.
 eei oles, tie on. jaa, kyllä se on kuuskymmentä vuotta aikaa tullu.
 juust vasta tie tehty.
 sit ei ol ollu tietä, se on ollu liki Jällivaarhaav viis peniŋkulmaa kantant.
 ei se niiv niin ra hauska homma sekkää.
 ei ole miellùtta olleŋkha.
 täältä kaloja vienhet ja vaihethanhej jauhuja ja kaffi(a ja sokkeri(a.
 takka mennessä takka tullessa.
 joo.
 joo mie olen kans kokenu se reissu.
 joo hän on kantannu mutta mi en ole kantan.
 niit on ollu äijjiä jokka oŋ kantanhe sata kilua jauhuja. se on ollu lujat miehet en enne vanhast. Seon niemess oll yks äijä joka oŋ kantanu, sata kilu- Ollin Filppaaksi sanotti. sata kilua lyöny selkhän̬, ja lähteny marsii. ja eikä sollu pitkä.

See also 
 Meänkieli
 Peräpohja dialects

References

Finnic languages
Finnish dialects
Languages of Sweden

External links 
 Meänkieli dictionary (Includes Gällivare dialect)